Slovenia selected their Junior Eurovision Song Contest 2015 entry through Mini EMA 2015. The competing songs were broken down into two semi-finals taking place on 20 September and 27 September 2015 and the final on 4 October 2015. Lina Kuduzović was declared the winner and she represented Slovenia with her song "Prva ljubezen". She ended 3rd with 112 points, marking Slovenia's best result in both the Junior and Adult Eurovision Song Contests.

Before Junior Eurovision

Mini EMA 2015 
Mini EMA 2015 was the Slovenian national final format that was used by RTV Slovenija to select Slovenia's entry for the Junior Eurovision Song Contest 2015.

Format 
Mini EMA 2015 consisted of two semi-finals and a final. Six artists competed in Mini EMA, with 3 songs in each semi-final. In the two semi-finals, a three-member jury panel selected the winning song to proceed to the final. In the final, public televoting exclusively determined the winner. The competition was broadcast as a part of the television program Vikend paket.

Competing entries
Artists and composers were able to submit their entries to the broadcaster between 17 July 2015 and 31 August 2015. An expert committee consisting of Alenka Godec (singer), Anka Jazbec (irector and conductor of the RTV Slovenija Children’s Choir) and Boštjan Grabnar (musician, composer, arranger and producer) selected six artists and songs for the competition from the received submissions. The competing artists were announced on 4 September 2015. The running order for the semi-finals were announced on 10 September 2015.

Semi-final 1 
The first semi-final of Mini EMA 2015 took place on 20 September 2015. A three-member jury panel selected "Najlepši dan" performed by Leni to proceed to the final. The jury consisted of Nuška Drašček (singer), Nina Pušlar (singer-songwriter) and Patrik Greblo (head of music production for RTV Slovenija).

Semi-final 2 
The second semi-final of Mini EMA 2015 took place on 27 September 2015. A three-member jury panel selected "Prva ljubezen" performed by Lina Kuduzović to proceed to the final. The jury consisted of Nuška Drašček (singer), Nina Pušlar (singer-songwriter) and Patrik Greblo (head of music production for RTV Slovenija).

Final
The final of Mini EMA 2015 took place on 4 October 2015. A public vote selected "Prva ljubezen" performed by Lina Kuduzović as the winner.

Artist and song information

Lina Kuduzović
Lina Kuduzović was born on 30 December 2002 in Ljubljana, the Slovenian capital. She's competed in many singing contests throughout her career, and has won many awards. In 2010 when she was just 7 years old Kuduzović won the first season of Slovenija ima talent (Slovenia's Got Talent).

Prva ljubezen
"Prva ljubezen" is a song by Slovenian child singer Lina Kuduzović who won first season of the Slovenia's Got Talent show. It represented Slovenia at the Junior Eurovision Song Contest 2015 in Bulgaria and she achieved 3rd place with 112 points which is Slovenia's best Junior Eurovision and Eurovision placing ever.

At Junior Eurovision
At the running order draw which took place on 15 November 2015, Slovenia were drawn to perform third on 21 November 2015, following  and preceding . Slovenia finished in third place with 112 points.

The final was broadcast in Slovenia on TV SLO 1 with commentary by Andrej Hofer. The Slovenian spokesperson, who announced the Slovenian votes during the final, was Nikola Petek.

Final
Lina was wearing a white dress with a blue ribbon and a heart on the side of it. There was a huge snowflake on the bottom of the stage, and snow was falling in the backdrop during the entire performance. "Prva ljubezen" is a wintry love story, so a huge castle and pine trees covered in snow decorated the backdrop throughout the entire song. Dry ice and a windmachine were used during her performance.

At the end of the voting, Slovenia placed 3rd with 112 points.

Voting
The voting during the final consisted of 50 percent public televoting and 50 percent from a jury deliberation. The jury consisted of five music industry professionals who were citizens of the country they represent, with their names published before the contest to ensure transparency. This jury was asked to judge each contestant based on: vocal capacity; the stage performance; the song's composition and originality; and the overall impression by the act. In addition, no member of a national jury could be related in any way to any of the competing acts in such a way that they cannot vote impartially and independently. The individual rankings of each jury member were released one month after the final.

Following the release of the full split voting by the EBU after the conclusion of the competition, it was revealed that Slovenia had placed third with the public televote and fourth with the jury vote. In the public vote, Slovenia scored 98 points, while with the jury vote, Slovenia scored 77 points.

Below is a breakdown of points awarded to Slovenia and awarded by Slovenia in the final and the breakdown of the jury voting and televoting conducted during the final.

Detailed voting results
The following members comprised the Slovene jury:
 Alenka Godec
 Miha Gorše
 Nuška Drašček
 Lea Sirk
 Boštjan Grabnar

Notes

References

Junior Eurovision Song Contest
Slovenia
Junior